Andrej Jezeršek (born 22 March 1982) is a Slovenian skier. He competed in the Nordic combined event at the 2002 Winter Olympics.

References

1982 births
Living people
Slovenian male Nordic combined skiers
Olympic Nordic combined skiers of Slovenia
Nordic combined skiers at the 2002 Winter Olympics
Sportspeople from Kranj